The Serie C of the Brazilian Championship 2015 is a football competition held in Brazil, equivalent to the third division. It is contested by 20 clubs.

Teams

Number of teams by state

League table

Group A

Group B

Final stage

References

External links
Série C at Terra.com.br

Campeonato Brasileiro Série C seasons
3